Paul Barwick (born 1946) is an American former LGBT rights activist and same-sex marriage pioneer. In 1971, he filed one of the first lawsuits in the history of the United States regarding the right of gays and lesbians to marry, after he and fellow activist John Singer (who had legally changed his name to Faygele Ben-Miriam) were denied a civil marriage license at the King County Administration Building in Seattle, Washington. The case, Singer v. Hara, was the best-known gay marriage case in the state of Washington until Andersen v. King County in 2006.

Born in Washington, Barwick served three years in the U.S. Army during the Vietnam War, working as a military policeman. Later, he became an emergency dispatcher for the Washington State Patrol, and attended Olympic College in Bremerton. He lived in San Francisco, California, which was his residence for 30 years, but he now currently lives in Centralia WA.

References

External links
Singer v. Hara, Washington Court of Appeals, May 1974.
'Non believers seek license to wed', The Advocate, November 1971.

1946 births
Living people
American atheists
American state police officers
American LGBT rights activists
LGBT people from Washington (state)
United States Army soldiers